Ekaterina Rabaya (born 6 November 1993) is a Russian sports shooter. She competed in the women's trap event at the 2016 Summer Olympics.

References

External links
 

1993 births
Living people
Russian female sport shooters
Olympic shooters of Russia
Shooters at the 2016 Summer Olympics
Sportspeople from Tula, Russia
Universiade medalists in shooting
Trap and double trap shooters
Universiade silver medalists for Russia
Medalists at the 2015 Summer Universiade
21st-century Russian women